is a passenger railway station located in the city of Ōme, Tokyo, Japan, operated by the East Japan Railway Company (JR East). It is notable for the distinctive pagoda-style roof on the station building.

Lines
Mitake Station is served by the Ōme Line, located 27.2 kilometers from the terminus of the line at Tachikawa Station.

Station layout
The station has one island platform serving two tracks, connected to the station building by an underground passage. The station is unattended

Platforms

History
The station opened on 1 September 1929. It was nationalized on 1 April 1944. It became part of the East Japan Railway Company (JR East) with the breakup of the Japanese National Railways on 1 April 1987.

Passenger statistics
In fiscal 2014, the station was used by an average of 683 passengers daily (boarding passengers only).

Surrounding area
Mount Mitake (Tokyo)
Tama River
former Ōme Kaidō highway

Bus routes
Toei Bus
梅76 - For Ōme Station (Runs on holidays only)
Nishi Tokyo Bus
Cable shita (Mitake Tozan Railway Takimoto Station is located near this bus stop)

See also
 List of railway stations in Japan

References

External links 

 JR East Station information (JR East) 

Railway stations in Tokyo
Ōme Line
Stations of East Japan Railway Company
Railway stations in Japan opened in 1929
Ōme, Tokyo